The eighth season of Family Guy first aired on the Fox network in twenty-one episodes from September 27, 2009, to May 23, 2010, before being released as two DVD box sets and in syndication. It ran on Sunday nights between May and July 2010 on BBC Three in the UK. The animated television series Family Guy follows the dysfunctional Griffin family—father Peter, mother Lois, daughter Meg, son Chris, baby Stewie and dog Brian, all of whom reside in their hometown of Quahog.

Starting with this season, the show is animated using Toon Boom Harmony.

As of season eight, the series entered its seventh production season. Production season seven was executive produced by Chris Sheridan, David Goodman, Danny Smith, Mark Hentemann, Steve Callaghan and series creator Seth MacFarlane. The season's showrunners were Hentemann and Callaghan, both of whom replaced previous showrunners Goodman and Sheridan. It was the last Family Guy season to be broadcast in 4:3 and in standard definition.

The season received negative reviews from critics, who cited a lack of original writing. More positive assessments revolved around the "tail end of the season," which "threw out all its old conventions and tried something remarkably different." Season eight contains some of the series' most acclaimed episodes, including "Road to the Multiverse", "Something, Something, Something, Dark Side" and "Dog Gone", as well as some of the most controversial episodes, including "Extra Large Medium", "Brian & Stewie", "Quagmire's Dad" and "Partial Terms of Endearment," which was banned from being aired on American TV, but has been released on DVD (as both a standalone episode and as part of the complete season set) and saw broadcast in the UK on BBC3. It was the recipient of a Primetime Emmy Award for Outstanding Individual Achievement in Animation and a Genesis Award for television comedy, and was nominated for a Primetime Emmy Award for Outstanding Original Music and Lyrics.

The Volume Eight DVD box set was released in Region 1 on June 15, 2010, Region 2 on November 1, 2010 and Region 4 on August 17, 2010. Eight of the twenty-one episodes are included in the volume. The remaining eleven episodes of the season were released on the Volume Nine DVD box set in Region 1 on December 13, 2011, and was released in Region 2 on May 9, 2011, and Region 4 on June 15, 2011. Two other episodes were released independently on DVD.

Production

Production for the eighth season began in 2008, during the airing of the seventh season. The season was executive produced by series regulars Chris Sheridan, David Goodman, Danny Smith, Mark Hentemann and Steve Callaghan, along with series creator Seth MacFarlane. The showrunners for the eighth season were Hentemann and Callaghan, who replaced Goodman and Sheridan, following the conclusion of the seventh production season.

As production began, Callaghan, Andrew Goldberg, Mark Hentemann, Patrick Meighan, Brian Scully, Chris Sheridan, Danny Smith, Alec Sulkin, John Viener and Wellesley Wild all stayed on from the previous season. Spencer Porter received his first writing credit for the series. Former recurring writers Kirker Butler and Gary Janetti returned to the series, with Butler leaving immediately afterward to work on The Cleveland Show. Matt Fleckenstein, who wrote two episodes for the show, left the series before the beginning of the eighth season.

Joseph Lee received his first directing credit for the series. Dominic Bianchi, Greg Colton, John Holmquist, Brian Iles, Jerry Langford, Pete Michels, James Purdum, Cyndi Tang and Julius Wu all stayed with the show from the previous season. "Blue Harvest" director Dominic Polcino briefly returned to the series to direct the episode's sequel, entitled "Something, Something, Something, Dark Side". Former recurring director Mike Kim left the series.

The main cast consisted of Seth MacFarlane (Peter Griffin, Stewie Griffin, Brian Griffin, Quagmire and Tom Tucker, among others), Alex Borstein (Lois Griffin, Loretta Brown, Tricia Takanawa and Barbara Pewterschmidt, among others), Mila Kunis (Meg Griffin), Seth Green (Chris Griffin and Neil Goldman, among others) and Mike Henry (Cleveland Brown and Herbert, among others).

Several new characters were introduced in season eight. The character of Jerome—Peter, Joe and Quagmire's official, yet temporary replacement for Cleveland Brown, who left the series to star in his own spin-off entitled The Cleveland Show—was introduced in the episode "Jerome is the New Black". He was voiced by The Cleveland Show cast member Kevin Michael Richardson. Quagmire's dad, Dan Quagmire, later renamed Ida after undergoing sex reassignment surgery, was also introduced, and voiced by series creator Seth MacFarlane, as well as Quagmire's daughter, named Anna Lee, voiced by Mae Whitman. Other guest stars who made multiple appearances as recurring characters from previous seasons were Carrie Fisher as Peter's boss Angela and Mike Henry as Cleveland Brown, who briefly returned in "The Splendid Source".

During the sixth season, episodes of Family Guy were delayed from regular broadcast due to the 2007–2008 Writers Guild of America strike. Series creator and executive producer Seth MacFarlane sided with the Writers Guild and participated in the strike until its conclusion. Because of this the seventh season consisted entirely of hold-overs. "Road to the Multiverse" was the first episode to be produced and aired after the strike ended. The season featured the series' 150th official episode, entitled "Brian & Stewie", which broke from the show's usual reliance on cutaways and cultural references and featured only Brian and Stewie trapped together in a vault. The season included a banned episode, entitled "Partial Terms of Endearment" for the first time since season three's "When You Wish Upon a Weinstein." The episode centered on Lois becoming a surrogate mother and being conflicted over whether or not to abort her best friend's baby, after her best friend dies. The episode was independently released on DVD on September 28, 2010, shortly after the ninth season premiere of Family Guy.

Episodes

Reception
The eighth-season premiere received a 5.2 rating share in the Nielsen ratings among viewers age 18 to 49, attracting 10.17 million viewers overall, the highest rated episode of the season. Both of these figures were significantly higher than those of the seventh-season finale. In the weeks following "Road to the Multiverse", viewership ratings hovered around 7 million. Aside from the premiere, "Family Goy", the second episode for the season, garnered the most views with 9.66 million, a high for the remainder of the eighth season. The episode "Dial Meg for Murder" received the fewest viewers for the season with 6.21 million viewers.

Episodes of the eighth season were nominated for and won several awards. On July 8, 2010, the song entitled "Down Syndrome Girl" from "Extra Large Medium" was nominated for a Primetime Emmy Award for Outstanding Music and Lyrics at the 62nd Primetime Emmy Awards. Series creator Seth MacFarlane and composer Walter Murphy were nominated for their work on the song's lyrics and music. On July 24, 2010, MacFarlane gave a live performance of the song at the San Diego Comic-Con International, to an audience of nearly 4,200 attendees. At the Creative Arts Awards on August 21, 2010, "Down Syndrome Girl" lost to the USA Network series Monk. Greg Colton, director of "Road to the Multiverse", was awarded the Primetime Emmy Award for Outstanding Individual Achievement in Animation for storyboarding the episode. In February 2010, "Dog Gone" won the Sid Caesar Comedy Award, at the annual Genesis Awards, for television comedy.

The Parents Television Council, a frequent critic of Family Guy, branded "Family Goy", "Dial Meg for Murder", "Extra Large Medium", "Go Stewie Go", "Brian & Stewie" and "Quagmire's Dad" as the "worst show of the week," a title frequently given to the series by the group. In response to the group's criticism, executive producer David Goodman claimed that Family Guy is "absolutely for adults", and that he does not allow his own children to watch the show.

The season received negative reviews from critics. Ramsey Isler of IGN wrote mixed comments about the season, saying, "There was a time when  was one of the funniest shows on TV; it was comedy gold. But somewhere along the line, the show's shine faded, its image was tarnished, and the magic disappeared", but added, "That's not to say that FG hasn't been good at all lately. Season 8 certainly had a few good episodes including the season opener, "Road to the Multiverse", which had a clever premise that was executed well. But after the first episode, the quality of the stories started to decline". He listed "Brian's Got a Brand New Bag", "Jerome Is the New Black", "Go Stewie Go", "Peter-assment" and "April in Quahog" as the worst episodes of the season. Isler praised the "tail end of the season", however, citing "Brian & Stewie" as "one of the better efforts the show has ever put out." In his review for the Family Guy volume eight DVD, Frank Rizzo of DVD Talk said, "The episodes stand on their own, whether you care about the dependence on easy gags and gimmicky concepts or not, because they are simply funny." Rizzo commented on the DVD release: "Fans of Family Guy, or any of MacFarlane's series for that matter, have to be concerned that the very reason the series continues to air, the DVDs the fans buy, are getting diluted and weakened, especially when you're getting less extras, less MacFarlane, and, for the first time, less of the commentaries that give you a peek into the show's creation.". To be fair, critics at the time had no idea of the dip in quality the show would endure going into the rest of the 2010s.

Home media release
The remaining episodes of the seventh season and the first eight episodes of the eighth season were released on DVD as Volume Eight by 20th Century Fox in the United States and Canada on June 15, 2010. The DVD release features bonus material including two featurettes, "Road to "Road to the Multiverse"" and "Family Guy Sings-A-Long Karaoke", along with audio commentaries and deleted scenes.

See also

Notes

References
General
Family Guy season eight episode guide. IGN. Retrieved 2010-07-02.

Specific

External links

 Season 8 at IMDb

 
Family Guy seasons
2009 American television seasons
2010 American television seasons